Simon Peter Wolverton (January 28, 1837 – October 25, 1910) was an American lawyer and Democratic politician who served two terms as a U.S. Representative from Pennsylvania from 1891 to 1895.

Early life and education
Simon Peter Wolverton was born in Rush Township, Northumberland County, Pennsylvania on January 28, 1837. He attended the common schools and Danville Academy, and later graduated from Lewisburg University, also known as Bucknell University in Lewisburg, Pennsylvania. He was principal of Sunbury Academy from 1860 to 1862.

Wolverton studied law and was called to the bar in 1862. He began his legal practice in Sunbury, Pennsylvania.

Civil War
During the American Civil War Wolverton raised a company of emergency men, of which he was appointed captain in 1862. He served in the Eighteenth Regiment, Pennsylvania Volunteers. He was later chosen as captain of Company F, Thirty-Sixth Regiment, Pennsylvania Volunteers in June 1863.

Political career
After the war he was elected to the Pennsylvania Senate, serving three terms from 1879 to 1891.

He was the unsuccessful Democratic nominee for the United States Senate in the joint convention of 1884.

He was elected to the 52nd Congress and the 53rd Congress (March 4, 1891 - March 3, 1895). He failed to be renominated in 1894.

Later career and death
After Congress, he continued to practice law in Sunbury until his death on October 25, 1910.

He was interred in Sunbury's Pomfret Manor Cemetery.

See also

Notes

References
 Retrieved on 2008-02-15
The Political Graveyard

1837 births
1910 deaths
Democratic Party members of the Pennsylvania House of Representatives
Pennsylvania lawyers
Union Army officers
Democratic Party members of the United States House of Representatives from Pennsylvania
19th-century American politicians
19th-century American lawyers